Welltown is a hamlet in the parish of Cardinham in Cornwall, England, United Kingdom.

Welltown is also a hamlet near Liskeard.

References

Hamlets in Cornwall